The 2022 FIBA Micronesia Basketball Cup was an international basketball tournament contested by national teams of Micronesia sub-zone of FIBA Oceania. The inaugural edition of the tournament was hosted by Guam from 8 to 11 June. The hosting has been awarded by FIBA following the decision to postpone the 2022 Micronesian Games to 2023, which was the qualification phase for 2023 Pacific Games.

The competition served as the sub-regional qualification phase for the basketball event of the 2023 Pacific Games in Solomon Islands with one berth allocated in this tournament, which serves as the official qualifier to the FIBA Asia Cup Pre-Qualifiers, wherein both men's and women's division were held.

 ruled both the men's and women's division by sweeping all of their assignments en route to the championship, enabling them to become the representative of Micronesia sub-zone to the basketball competitions of the 2023 Pacific Games.

Teams
Initially there are seven teams that were supposed to participate in the competition. On 24 March,  and  has sent their apologies as they will not be able to participate due to travel restrictions imposed amidst the COVID-19 pandemic. The remaining four teams later confirmed their participation.

 (Host)
 **
 **
 **

** Withdrew

Men's division

Preliminary round
All times are local (UTC+10).

Final round
Bronze-medal match

Gold-medal match

Final rankings
The champion will qualify for the 2023 Pacific Games.

Women's division

Preliminary round
All times are local (UTC+10).

Final round
Bronze-medal match

Gold-medal match

Final rankings
The champion will qualify for the 2023 Pacific Games.

References

International sports competitions hosted by Guam
FIBA
Micronesia Basketball Cup
FIBA